Sykes may refer to:

People

 Sir Alan Sykes, 1st Baronet, businessman and British politician
 Annette Sykes, New Zealand human rights lawyer and Māori activist
 Bob Sykes (American football), American football player
 Bob Sykes (baseball), American baseball pitcher
 Bob Sykes (ice hockey), Canadian ice hockey player
 Bobbi Sykes, Australian author and land rights activist
 Bryan Sykes, British academic and geneticist
 Christopher Sykes (author), British author
 Christopher Sykes (politician), British politician
 Diane S. Sykes, judge on the United States Court of Appeals
 Edmund Sykes, Catholic martyr
 Emilia Sykes, American politician
 Eric Sykes, comedic writer and actor
 Eric A. Sykes, developer of the Fairbairn-Sykes fighting knife
 Ernest Sykes (VC), recipient of the Victoria Cross
 Ernest Ruthven Sykes (1867–1954), malacologist from Great Britain
 Eugene O. Sykes (1876–1945), justice on the Mississippi Supreme Court
 Frederick Henry Sykes (1863–1917), Canadian-American educator and college president
 Sir Frederick Hugh Sykes, British military officer and politician
 George Sykes, U.S. Army general
 Gresham Sykes (born 1922), American sociologist and criminologist
 Homer Sykes, Canadian-born British photographer
 Congressman James Sykes (Continental Congress), lawyer and American politician
 Governor James Sykes (governor), physician and American politician
 Rod Sykes, Canadian politician
 John Sykes, rock musician
 John Sykes (American football) (1949–2019), American football player
John Sykes (composer) (1909–1962), English composer and music teacher, born in India
 John Sykes (politician), British politician
 John H. Sykes Tampa Bay area businessman and founder of Sykes inc.
 Keifer Sykes (born 1993), American basketball player
 Sir Mark Sykes, British politician and diplomatic advisor
 Melanie Sykes (born 1970), English television and radio presenter, and model
 Nathan Sykes (born 1993), member of boy band The Wanted
 Norman Sykes (1936–2009), English footballer
 Oliver Sykes, frontman of Bring Me the Horizon
 Paul Sykes (boxer) (1946–2007), English heavyweight boxer of the 1970s and 1980s
 Paul Sykes (businessman) (born 1943), English Eurosceptic businessman, and political donor
 Paul Sykes (rugby league) (born 1981), rugby league footballer of the 1990s, 2000s and 2010s
 Paul Sykes (singer), American folksinger of the 1960s 
 Sir Percy Sykes, British soldier, geographer and travel writer
 Peter Sykes (director) (1939–2006), Australian/British film director
 Peter Sykes (chemist) (1923–2003), British chemist
 Sir Richard Sykes (biochemist), businessman and university rector
 Sir Richard Sykes (diplomat), diplomat assassinated in 1979
 Richard Sykes (rugby union), Rugby player and Dakota landowner
 Stephen Sykes, ecclesiologist
 Sykes family of Sledmere
 Tatton Sykes (disambiguation)
 Thomas Sykes (Mississippi politician), African-American legislator in Mississippi during Reconstruction
 Thomas A. Sykes, African-American legislator in North Carolina and Tennessee during Reconstruction
 Thomas Hardcastle Sykes, businessman
 Timothy Sykes (born 1981), penny stock trader
 Tom Sykes, British motorcycle racer
 Wanda Sykes, comedian and actress
 William Sykes (1852–1910), English businessman 
 Colonel William Henry Sykes, military officer, politician, and ornithologist
 William Robert Sykes, British railway signal engineer

Companies
 Sykes Bleaching Company
 Sykes Enterprises, Incorporated, a family of global companies delivering business process outsourcing services

Characters
 Bill Sykes, antagonist from the animated Disney film Oliver & Company
Fredrick Sykes, one of the main antagonists of the 1993 action film The Fugitive
 Mr. Sykes, a character from the film Shark Tale, voiced by Martin Scorsese
 Sgt. Michael "Psycho" Sykes, the main character in the game Crysis Warhead, and a secondary character in Crysis
Reverend Sykes, a character from Harper Lee's novel To Kill a Mockingbird
 Robert "Pliers" Sykes, character in the game Wing Commander IV

Places
 Sykes, Lancashire, England
 Sykesville, Maryland, USA
 Forward Operating Base Sykes, a U.S. military base in Iraq
 Sykes Camp, a campground in California

Other
 4438 Sykes, an asteroid
 Sykes (dog), a dog actor from Clifton, Oxfordshire, England
 Sykes (TV series), a British sitcom that aired on BBC 1 from 1972 to 1979
 Sykes baronets, four separate baronetcies of Great Britain or the United Kingdom

See also 
 Sikes (disambiguation)
 Syke (disambiguation)
 

English-language surnames
Surnames of English origin